Wildflower was a 1914 American silent romantic drama film produced by Adolph Zukor and directed by Allan Dwan. It stars stage actress Marguerite Clark in her first motion picture. Clark would be one of the few stage stars to go on to superstardom in silent pictures. The film is now presumed lost.

Cast
 Marguerite Clark - Letty Roberts
 Harold Lockwood - Arnold Boyd
 James Cooley - Gerald Boyd
 Edgar L. Davenport - The Lawyer
 Jack Pickford - Bud Haskins

References

External links
 
 

1914 films
1914 romantic drama films
American romantic drama films
American silent feature films
American black-and-white films
Famous Players-Lasky films
Films directed by Allan Dwan
Lost American films
Paramount Pictures films
Lost romantic drama films
1914 lost films
1910s American films
Silent romantic drama films
Silent American drama films
1910s English-language films